Aithorape is a genus of moths in the family Megalopygidae.

Species
Aithorape albicostata Hopp, 1927
Aithorape analis Hopp, 1930
Aithorape candelabraria Hopp, 1927
Aithorape flammicornis (Schaus, 1905)
Aithorape frontalis (Schaus, 1920)
Aithorape longanella Hopp, 1927
Aithorape roseicornis (Dognin, 1899)
Aithorape spinulata Hopp, 1927

References

Megalopygidae
Megalopygidae genera